Creobius eudouxii is a species of beetle in the family Carabidae, the only species in the genus Creobius.

References

Broscini
Monotypic Carabidae genera